Sir John Ernest Neale  (7 December 1890 in Liverpool – 2 September 1975) was an English historian who specialised in Elizabethan and Parliamentary history. From 1927 to 1956, he was the Astor Professor of English History at University College London.

Academic career
Neale was trained by the political historian A. F. Pollard. His first professional appointment was the chair of Modern History at the University of Manchester, and he was then to succeed his old mentor A. F. Pollard as Astor Professor of English History at University College London in 1927. He was to hold this post until 1956.  In 1955, Neale was knighted, and on 17 November 1958 he delivered a lecture in Washington, D.C. commemorating Elizabeth I's accession to the English throne four hundred years previously. From 1956, Neale was Professor Emeritus, but continued to do some academic teaching at University College London.

He died in 1975 and was buried in Harrogate Cemetery. He had married Elfreda Skelton of Harrogate, with whom he had a daughter, Stella.

Historical views
Neale was the leading Elizabethan historian of his generation. In the opinion of fellow historian, and Neale's own graduate student, Patrick Collinson, Neale's biography of Elizabeth I "has yet to be bettered".

His painstaking research uncovered the political power of the gentry in The Elizabethan House of Commons (1949), whilst his 1948 Raleigh Lecture on ‘The Elizabethan political scene’ greatly expanded our knowledge of the politics of the reign. The two volumes on Elizabeth I and her Parliaments (1953 and 1957) explored the relationship between the Queen and her Parliaments. These were criticised by Sir Geoffrey Elton who claimed that the main preoccupation of these parliaments was the forming of Bills and the passing of Acts, not conflict between Crown and Parliament. Neale's claims that these parliaments were a landmark in the evolution of Parliament was criticised by medievalists such as J. S. Roskell. However Collinson notes that the conflicts which Neale wrote about did take place and that Neale's retelling of them made an exciting and unforgettable chapter in English history.

Neale is well known for his thesis on the Elizabethan Puritan Choir, in which he claimed that a group of Puritan MPs successfully managed to force Elizabeth's hand on many policy issues throughout her reign, including at the start. Neale is also recognised for his work in bringing to light new sources on Tudor England, and developing different ways of studying the period.

Other positions held

 Trustee of the London Museum
 Member of the Editorial Board of the History of Parliament
 Fellow of the British Academy
 Honorary Member of the American Academy of Arts and Sciences

Works

 Queen Elizabeth (1934)
 The Elizabethan Political Scene (1948)
 The Elizabethan House of Commons (1949)
 Elizabeth I and her Parliaments (1953 and 1957)
 Essays in Elizabethan History (1958)
 The Age of Catherine de Medici (1963)

See also
 Puritan choir
 Elizabethan Religious Settlement

Notes

Further reading
 
 

1890 births
1975 deaths
Historians of Puritanism
Fellows of the British Academy
Academics of University College London
James Tait Black Memorial Prize recipients
20th-century English historians